Naval flags, both Naval jacks and naval ensigns, are a subset of Maritime flags flown by naval forces.

There are several lists of naval flags, organised by present or former country:

Current countries
Australia - List of Australian flags § Royal Australian Navy
Bangladesh - List of Bangladeshi flags § Military
Belgium - List of Belgian flags § Military
Croatia - List of Croatian flags § Maritime flags
Hungary - List of Hungarian flags § Naval flags
India - List of Indian flags § Navy
Ireland - List of flags of Ireland § Naval service
Japan - List of Japanese flags § Self-Defense Force and Imperial Army/Navy
Latvia - List of Latvian flags § Military flags
Norway - List of flags of Norway § Flags of the Navy
Poland - List of Polish naval and maritime flags, List of Polish flags § Navy
Russia - List of Russian navy flags
Thailand - List of flags of the Royal Thai Armed Forces § Royal Thai Navy
United Kingdom - List of British flags § Naval service
United States - Flags of the United States Armed Force § Maritime flags

Former countries
USSR - List of USSR navy flags
Yugoslavia - List of Yugoslav flags § Military flags

See also
Maritime flag
Naval jack
Naval ensign
Flag of the United States Navy
Blue Ensign
Red Ensign
White Ensign

List of flags

 :Category:Lists and galleries of flags
 Lists of lists
 List of Bangladeshi flags